Royal Air Force Hampstead Norris or more simply RAF Hampstead Norris is a former Royal Air Force (RAF) satellite station located  north east of Hampstead Norreys, Berkshire, England and  north west of Reading, Berkshire.

Station history

The construction contract was awarded to Wimpey in May 1940 valued at £233,000. It was opened in mid 1940. Unusually the runways met at a single point, an obvious target to disable the entire airfield.

Based units

No. 15 Operational Training Unit relocated to Hampstead Norris on 1 June 1940.  The airfield hosted a number of squadrons of Vickers Wellington bombers.  The airfield was used extensively as a glider training station during the latter part of the war, many glider pilots were trained here in preparation for D-Day.  It also had 33 de Havilland Tiger Moths as training aircraft.  The main role of the airfield was to ferry Wellingtons to Egypt, via Gibraltar and Malta.

On 15 March 1945 No. 13 OTU arrived with their de Havilland Mosquitoes and the airfield reverted to being a satellite of RAF Harwell.

The following units also were here at some point:
 No. 42 OTU
 No. 1516 (Beam Approach Training) Flight RAF
 No. 1526 (Beam Approach Training) Flight RAF
 Operational and Refresher Training Unit RAF

It became an ammunition storage depot as part of the Bramley Central Ammunition Depot near Basingstoke after its closure in 1946.

Enemy action

The site was bombed on 16 September 1940 by the Luftwaffe in the Battle of Britain. Three bombs fell on the runways.

On 4 March 1941 a Wellington was attacked by a German fighter as it approached to land.

The airfield was attacked on 12 May 1941 with 10 High Explosive bombs and 100 Incendiaries.  One Wellington was destroyed and the flare path and the southern taxiway were damaged.

Current use

Little of the wartime station now remains.  There are four remaining pillboxes and some air raid shelters in the woods.  Part of the bomb storage site remains also.  The site still maintains a modern link with aviation with a farm strip used by a Tiger Moth biplane.  A light beacon is also situated on the edge of an old airfield peri track as the site is under the flightpath of aircraft flying to and from Heathrow airport on Airway Green One.  An important VOR beacon, Compton (CPT), is also located here. It is now known as Haw Farm, part of the Yattendon Estate.

References

Citations

Bibliography

External links
Present day photographs and history

Royal Air Force stations in Berkshire
Royal Air Force stations of World War II in the United Kingdom